Art Brut Top of the Pops is a compilation album by the band Art Brut. As well as a 'best of' set, the two-disc collection includes two new songs, "Arizona Bay" and "We Make Pop Music", as well as B-sides, cover versions, demos and live material.

Track listing

CD1 is a best of set, chronologically collecting highlights from band's back catalogue. It contains two brand new songs, 'Arizona Bay' and 'We Make Pop Music'.

 Tracks 1-5 from Bang Bang Rock & Roll, released by Rough Trade (2005)
 Tracks 6-9 from It's A Bit Complicated, released by EMI (2007)
 Tracks 10-13 from Art Brut vs Satan, released by Cooking Vinyl (2009)
 Tracks 14-17 from Brilliant! Tragic!, released by Cooking Vinyl (2011)

CD2 is a collection of  b-sides, covers, live tracks and demos "that Freddy Feedback rescued" from the Art Brut vaults, including unreleased demos from the ‘Its A Bit Complicated’ recording sessions that took place with Pulp’s Russell Senior.

Credits

Eddie Argos - vocals
Chris Chinchilla - Guitar
Ian Catskilkin - Guitar
Jasper Future - Guitar
Freddy Feedback - Bass guitar
Mike Breyer - drums

References

Art Brut albums
2013 compilation albums